WAYG-LP (104.7 FM) is a radio station licensed to serve the community of Miami, Florida. The station is owned by Calvary Chapel Miami. It airs a religious format.

The station was assigned the WAYG-LP call letters by the Federal Communications Commission on January 8, 2015.

References

External links
 Official Website
 

AYG-LP
Radio stations established in 2016
2016 establishments in Florida
Radio stations in Miami
AYG-LP
Calvary Chapel Association